Social comparison bias is the tendency to have feelings of dislike and competitiveness with someone seen as physically, socially, or mentally better than oneself. Social comparison bias or social comparison theory is the idea that individuals determine their own worth based on how they compare to others. The theory was developed in 1954 by psychologist Leon Festinger. This can be compared to social comparison, which is believed to be central to achievement motivation, feelings of injustice, depression, jealousy and people's willingness to remain in relationships or jobs. The basis of the theory is that people are believed to compete for the best outcome in relation to their peers. For example, one might make a comparison between the low-end department stores they go to frequently and the designer stores of their peers. Such comparisons may evoke feelings of resentment, anger and envy with their peers. This bias revolves mostly around wealth and social status; it is unconscious and people who make these are largely unaware of them.  In most cases, people try to compare themselves to those in their peer group or with whom they are similar.

Research
There are many studies revolving around social comparison and the effects it has on mental health.  One study involved the relationship between depression and social comparison.  Thwaites and Dagnan in "Moderating variables in the relationship between social comparison and depression", investigated the relationship between social comparison and depression utilizing an evolutionary framework.  Their hypothesis was that depression was an outcome from social comparisons that people carried out.  This study investigated the moderating effects on social comparison of the importance of comparison dimensions to the person, and of the perceived importance of the dimensions to other people.  What the researchers used to measure the depression in their participants was a self-esteem test called the Self Attributes Questionnaire created by Pelham and Swann in 1989.  The test consisted of 10-point Likert scale ratings on 10 individual social comparison dimensions (e.g. intelligence, social skills, sense of humor).  "Questions were added to explore beliefs regarding the importance of social comparison dimensions.  Data was collected from a combined clinical sample and non-clinical sample of 174 people."  They concluded that social comparison did have a relationship with depression based on the data that they collected.  More people that contributed in social comparisons had a higher level of depression than people that rarely used social comparison. It has been shown that there are two forms of comparison as it pertains to social comparison. There is upward comparison which relates to when we compare ourselves to others who seem better off or are better than us. In downward comparison, we tend to compare ourselves to those who are less than us. Whatever the case may be, this creates a competitive attitude from oneself.

Cognitive effects
One major symptom that can occur with social comparison bias is the mental disorder of depression.  Depression is typically diagnosed during a clinical encounter using the Diagnostic and Statistical Manual of Mental Disorders volume IV (DSM-IV) criteria.  Symptoms include depressed mood, hopelessness, and sleep difficulties, including both hypersomnia and insomnia.  Clinical depression can be caused by many factors in a person's life.  Major depressive disorder is the common mental illness associated to social comparison bias.  Depression has a biological explanation to why people lose hope in life.  It is caused by the brain because of the hippocampus decreasing in size and the lowering levels of serotonin that circulates through the brain.  Another negative symptom that is associated to social comparison bias is suicide ideation. Suicidal ideation can be defined as the constant thoughts about suicide and suicide attempts. Suicidal ideation can occur due to social comparison bias because people that compare themselves to people that are seen better than themselves get mentally discouraged because they believe they can not perform or look a certain way which causes low self-esteem.  Low self-esteem is one of the main factors in suicidal ideation. Additionally, with social comparison bias, one can experience an increased sense of anxiety. This can be anxiety due to many things such as their own progress in life. This anxiety can not only manifest in the sense of being anxious to log on to social media and see posts, but can then turn into social anxiety when seeing those on social media in person. This could potentially be a trigger. Specifically as it pertains to anxiety and body image, you can be triggered easily when on social media. "A common problem with social media is the tendency for people to compare themselves to others. Social media is a place where people tend to tailor the image of themselves to only present positive things. When other people present their stories or images of success, achievement, beauty, love or happiness it can trigger feelings of inferiority."

Physical/Behavioral Effects 
Social comparison can lead to some partaking in harmful acts as a coping mechanism. This could, but is not limited to drug/substance abuse, self harm (such as cutting), eating disorders (especially anorexia nervosa and bulimia nervosa), alcoholism, and other unhealthy coping mechanisms. 

As social comparison pertains to social media comparison, one can take action steps to unfollow individuals/pages that are triggers. On the other hand, it could prove beneficial to follow more inspirational and uplifting accounts. Taking a break from social media has proven to help.

In the media
Mainstream media is also a main contributor to social comparisons. Taking beauty as an example, everywhere one goes advertisements try to portray to the public what beauty should be. Magazines, commercials and billboards all show what beauty is supposed to look like. When a growing generation of youth and adults see this, they socially compare themselves to the advertisements they see all around them. When they do not look a certain way or weigh a certain amount, society puts them down for it. This can cause low self-esteem and an onset of depression because they do not fit the mold of what beauty is seen to be. People get criticized when they do not look like the models in the magazine or on TV. Socially comparing oneself to the people in the media can have negative effects and cause mental anxiety, stress, negative body image and eating disorders. With media being such an important part of modern Western culture, having low self-esteem and negative self-image of oneself effects society with tragic incidents including suicide and self-harm.  Social comparison to others can cause people to lose confidence in themselves and stress over trying to be perfect and be what society expects them to be.  In an experiment that studied women's body image after comparing themselves to different types of models, body image was significantly more negative after viewing thin media images than after viewing images of either average-size models, or plus-size models. Media is one of the leading causes for negative body image among youth and adults because of social comparison.

Through social media
Social media being a main source of news and breaking new stories can help people connect with each other and learn in new ways.  It is easier to see people's private life on a public network.  This being said, social networks such as Facebook makes viewing someone's daily life as simple as sending a request.  Society is exposed to everyone's lives and people are starting to compare themselves with their friends that they have on Facebook.  It is easy to log in and see someone brag about their success or their new belongings and feel bad about oneself.  In recent studies, researchers have been linking Facebook with depression in this generation of social media.  They may start to have low self-esteem by seeing their friends online have more exciting lives and more popularity. This social comparison bias among social network users online can make people start to think of their lives as not as fulfilling as they want to be. They see pictures or statuses about job promotions or new jobs, vacations; new relationships, fun outings or even those that can afford nice things. This can cognitively affect people's self-esteem and is recognized as a possible factor in depressive disorders. They can start to feel bad about their appearance and their life in general. Social media influences the number of social comparisons people have. One study found that the more time users spend on Facebook each week, the more likely they are to think that others were happier and having better lives than they themselves.

Social comparison bias in the classroom
Social comparisons are also relevant in the school system.  Students depending on their grade level can be competitive about the grades they receive compared to their peers.  Social comparisons not only influence students' self-concepts but also improve their performance. This social comparison process leads to a lower self-concept when the class level is high and to a higher self-concept when the class level is low. Therefore, two students with equal performance in a domain may develop different self-concepts when they belong to different classes with different performance levels.  Social comparisons are important and valid predictors of students' self-evaluations and achievement behavior.  Students may feel jealousy or competitiveness when it comes to grades and getting into better colleges and universities than their peers.  Social comparison can also motivate students to do well because they want to keep along with their peers.

Conclusion

Social comparison bias can occur in people's everyday life.  Whether it is on social networking sites, in the media, in society regarding wealth and social status or in the school system, it can be harmful to one's mental health due to the increasing risks of depression, suicide ideation and other mental disorders.  Social comparison in this generation is everywhere and society revolves around comparing themselves to one another if it is to have a higher self-esteem or to try and better themselves as a whole.  With this importance, it will lead to social comparison bias and cause negative effects in a person's life.  Based on the research found, the hypothesis was proven correct stating that depression does have a relationship with the social comparison that people in society participate in.

See also
 Social comparison theory
 Instagram's impact on people
 List of cognitive biases

References

Sources

 Published as:
 

 

 

Cognitive biases